Philippe, Duke of Anjou (Philippe Louis; 30 August 1730 – 7 April 1733) was a French prince and the second son of King Louis XV of France and Marie Leszczyńska. He was styled Duke of Anjou from birth.

Biography 
Philippe was born at the Palace of Versailles on 30 August 1730, the second son and fifth child of Louis XV of France and Marie Leszczyńska. As a son of the king, he held the rank of a fils de France ("son of France"), which also entitled him to the style of Royal Highness. In his short lifetime, he was the third most important male at court, after his father Louis XV and his elder brother Louis, Dauphin of France.

Philippe was styled Duke of Anjou from birth; this title had last been bestowed on his father, from his own birth in 1710 until his accession to the throne in 1715.

Philippe grew up at Versailles with his brother, the Dauphin, and their twin sisters Louise Élisabeth (Madame Royale, later Duchess of Parma) and Henriette (Madame Seconde). In his short lifetime, Philippe saw the birth of his younger sister Madame Adélaïde, in March 1732, and the death of his older sister Marie Louise de France (Madame Troisième) from the common cold, in February 1733.

Always a sickly child, Philippe was cared for by a group of female attendants, as royal children were cared for by women until the age of five. As part of their intensely superstitious beliefs, the women mixed in earth from the grave of Saint Medard with his food; the child was given so much earth that his organs failed. As a result, Philippe died at Versailles on 7 April 1733, at the age of two. He was buried at the Royal Basilica of Saint Denis outside Paris.

Ancestry

Notes 

1730 births
1733 deaths
18th-century French people
People from Versailles
Dukes of Anjou
Courtesy dukes
French people of Polish descent
Princes of France (Bourbon)
Burials at the Basilica of Saint-Denis
Children of Louis XV
Royalty and nobility who died as children
Sons of kings